A dürüm ("roll") or dürme is a Turkish wrap that is usually filled with typical döner kebab ingredients. The wrap is made from lavash or yufka flatbreads. It is common as a street food in Turkey but can also be found in sit-down restaurants.

See also
 Burrito
 Roti
 Shawarma
 Gyros

References

Further reading
 

Flatbread dishes
Turkish words and phrases
Turkish sandwiches
Street food in Turkey
Hot sandwiches